Sir Robert Worsley  (died 1604/5), of Booths, Lancashire, was an English politician.

He was a Member (MP) of the Parliament of England for Callington in 1589.

References

Year of birth missing
1605 deaths
English MPs 1589
Politicians from Lancashire
Members of the Parliament of England for Callington